Dysoxylum rugulosum is a tree in the family Meliaceae. The specific epithet  is from the Latin meaning "small wrinkles", referring to the surface of the leaflets.

Description
The bark is brown. The sweetly scented flowers are yellowish.

Distribution and habitat
Dysoxylum rugulosum is found in Sumatra, Peninsular Malaysia and Borneo. Its habitat is rain forests from sea-level to  altitude.

References

rugulosum
Trees of Sumatra
Trees of Peninsular Malaysia
Trees of Borneo
Plants described in 1895